of Tokyo, Japan, is a private, non-profit grant-making organization. It was established in 1962 by Ryoichi Sasakawa. The foundation's mission is to direct Japanese motorboat racing revenue into philanthropic activities, it uses this money to pursue global maritime development and assistance for humanitarian work, both at home and abroad. In the humanitarian field, it focuses on such fields as social welfare, public health, and education. The foundation has also been criticized for promoting Japanese historical revisionism, particularly in whitewashing Japanese war crimes committed in World War II.

Since 2003 the foundation has promoted sign language with the aim of allowing deaf people to fully participate in society, in this way, they created scholarships for deaf people at Gallaudet University and the National Technical Institute for the Deaf (NTID) of USA.

The current chairman is Yohei Sasakawa, World Health Organization Goodwill Ambassador for Leprosy Elimination, Special Envoy of the Government of Japan for National Reconciliation in Myanmar, and the son of the foundation's founder, Ryoichi Sasakawa.

History 
Leadership
 1962–1995 – Ryoichi Sasakawa: businessman, politician, philanthropist
 1996–2005 – Ayako Sono: Novelist
 2005–present – Yōhei Sasakawa: WHO Goodwill Ambassador for Leprosy Elimination, Japan's Ambassador for the Human Rights of People Affected by Leprosy, Special Envoy of the Government of Japan for National Reconciliation in Myanmar.

Examples of major initiatives

1962–1970
In 1962, The Nippon Foundation was established under the auspices of the Japanese Motorboat Racing Law. The law and the foundation were initiatives of Ryoichi Sasakawa who, as chair, used them to both help rebuild the Japanese shipbuilding sector, and to conduct philanthropic activities around the world. This system of using gambling revenue to provide aid to needy sectors was a novel one in Japan at that time, and came under intense scrutiny. In response, the foundation strove for transparency in conducting its activities, making its records publicly accessible from its earliest days.

Initiatives pursued in this period include research for the development of super tankers and their engines, direct support for the shipbuilding industry, and the protection of safety in the Strait of Malacca—vital to Japan's national security, due to the fact that more than 80 percent of her oil passes this way.

In the field of public welfare, the foundation pursued such youth-oriented initiatives as the building of sports facilities, the building of day care centers and the promotion of traffic safety education. In addition, it began donating mobile clinics and blood-mobiles, as well as constructing blood banks around the country.

1971–1980

In the 1970s, the foundation continued to pursue its efforts to improve social services through such measures as the distribution of ambulances, training in the use of fire fighting equipment, the development of preventative measures for earthquakes and PR for the fire-fighting sector. It also donated medical ships to provide medical aid for people living on remote islands in Japan's inland sea.

In 1971, it began its overseas work, and in 1974 established the Sasakawa Memorial Health Foundation for the purpose of eliminating leprosy as a public health problem—an effort that has resulted in its elimination in all but 1 of the 122 countries where the disease was initially prevalent.

1981–1990
Support for the maritime world remained an important focus in the 1980s, building on the work of the previous decade. Examples of projects include "Swift Wings", which was a sail system designed for modern cargo ships, and research toward a "Techno Superliner", a 1,000-ton cargo vessel that could attain speeds of up to 50 knots.

On the international cooperative support front, the foundation involved itself heavily in disaster relief, sending aid to help the victims of major disasters in countries around the world, and establishing the United Nations Sasakawa Award for Disaster Relief.

Health initiatives that began in this decade include the establishment of the WHO Sasakawa Health prize and a massive project to aid the victims of the Chernobyl nuclear power disaster, under which the foundation spent a total of more than US$50 million over ten years, screening over 200,000 children for thyroid cancer.

Up until 1988, the foundation went by the name the Japanese Shipbuilding Industry Foundation (JSIF), and even donated some supposedly $500,000 worth of fireworks to the Los Angeles 1984 Organizing Committee for use in those Olympics. It was much more than the LA Organizing Committee wanted to use, and they were forced to come up with a 25-minute fireworks show to accommodate the gift and NOT slight the Foundation.  Sometime around 1988–1989, the foundation dropped that moniker and went by several other names including the all-inclusive "Nippon" Foundation.

In response to the Ethiopian famine of the mid-1980s, the foundation began a program of agricultural education throughout sub-Saharan Africa that eventually reached 14 countries, improving farmers’ yields by up to six times in some places.

Finally, as a part of its human resources development program, the foundation created the Sasakawa Young Leaders’ Fellowship Fund, a program that would eventually establish million-dollar funds at a total of 68 major universities around the world.

1991–2000
In the 1990s, on the home front, the Nippon Foundation invested heavily in the elderly of Japan, pushing for the improvement of retirement homes, building model retirement homes, and helping the nation to develop its hospice system nearly from the ground up. Related to this field, the foundation also began donating specially equipped vehicles to social welfare facilities and groups, enabling them to provide mobility services to the elderly and those with disability.

The decade also saw one of Japan's worst earthquakes of the 20th century, and the disorganization of volunteer groups in the wake of the quake lead the foundation to put special attention on bringing these many groups together under one umbrella—the volunteer support center—a central body that coordinated volunteer effort in the event of a major disaster.

In the maritime development field, the foundation began to turn its eye to the disparity in the level of training received by maritime experts in various countries. As a result, it provided funding for a scholarship for people from developing countries to attend the World Maritime University, in Malmö, Sweden. In perhaps an even broader effort, it created the International Association of Maritime Universities, uniting 50 institutions around the world, in an effort to standardize both the level of education and the materials used.

2001–present
The past years have seen the foundation continue to build on its work of the first four decades, working in the maritime, welfare and international cooperation fields.

Since its origins, the foundation has been interested in aiding the nation's shipbuilding and maritime efforts, leading it to support both a display of a North Korean spy vessel that had been sunk by the Japanese Self Defense Forces, and a survey of Okinotori Island.
In addition, the foundation is providing support toward the establishment of a user-pays system to help the nations surrounding the Strait of Malacca in their efforts to both police the waters and maintain their environmental integrity.

In international affairs, the foundation has most recently built more than 100 elementary schools in Myanmar and 100 in Cambodia. It has established a novel program to provide Mongolian nomadic families with boxes full of traditional medicines that can be replenished, at the cost only of those medicines used, a few times a year, when they come to market.

Controversies

Peru National Program for Reproductive Health and Family Planning
According to conclusion of the Investigative Commission appointed by the Peru Congress, the Nippon Foundation was one of the organizations providing financial support for the forced sterilizations of impoverished Peruvians, initially laid out in the leaked documents of "Plan Verde" and subsequently executed by the Alberto Fujimori government as part of its National Population Program.

Organizations established
 The Blue Sea and Green Land Foundation
 Fondation Franco-Japonaise Sasakawa
 Foundation for Encouragement of Social Contribution 
 The Great Britain Sasakawa Foundation
 Japan Gateball Union
 The Japan Science Society
 Japan Social Innovation Investment Foundation
 The Japanese Foundation for the Promotion of Maritime Science and The Museum of Maritime Science
 The Life Planning Center Foundation
 Marine Sports Foundation
 Nippon Ginkenshibu Foundation
 Nippon Music Foundation
 Nippon Taiko Foundation
 Ocean Policy Research Foundation
 Sasakawa Africa Association
 The Sasakawa Central Europe Fund
 Sasakawa Health Science Foundation
 The Sasakawa Japan-China Friendship Fund
 Sasakawa Memorial Health Foundation

 The Sasakawa Peace Foundation
 The Sasakawa Pan-Asia Fund
 Sasakawa Sports Foundation
 The Scandinavia-Japan Sasakawa Foundation
 The Tokyo Foundation for Policy Research
 The Sasakawa International Center for Space Architecture (SICSA)
 Nereus Program

References 

Charities based in Japan
Foundations based in Japan
Grants (money)
Sports charities